Michael Lazarus (born 1969) is an American painter. He has been working since the early 1990s.

Career
His first solo exhibition was in 1998 at Feature, Inc. Lazarus was represented by Feature until 2011, exhibiting alongside artists including B. Wurtz, Dike Blair, Jim Isermann, Tom Friedman, Lisa Beck, Takashi Murakami, and Lily van der Stokker. In 2000, he was one of the first 'alternative' artists to have a solo show in the "Gallery 2" program at Andrea Rosen Gallery. Lazarus has had solo exhibitions in Los Angeles, San Francisco, Montreal, Antwerp, and Amsterdam. In 2006 Lazarus' works were exhibited in conversation with Emory Douglas and Corita Kent in "That was then... This is now" at MoMA PS1.

Lazarus has also worked as a collaborator in the group Assume Vivid Astro Focus, on two separate projects. Lazarus' work is included in several public and private collections, including The Frances Young Tang Teaching Museum and Art Gallery, The Portland Art Museum, The Progressive Corporation, and JPMorgan Chase. His work is featured in Cut & Paste: 21st-Century Collage.

References

Additional sources

1969 births
Living people
20th-century American painters